Nojiri may refer to:

Nojiri, Miyazaki, a former Japanese town in Miyazaki Prefecture, now merged into Kobayashi
Lake Nojiri, body of water near the town of Shinano, Japan
3008 Nojiri, a main-belt asteroid
Nojiri-juku (Nakasendō), historical rest point along the former Japanese trade route of Nakasendō
Higashi-Nojiri Station, train station in Tonami, Japan
Kami-Nojiri Station, train station in Nishiaizu, Japan
Nishi-Nojiri Station, train station in Inabe, Japan
Nojiri Station, train station on the Chūō Main Line of Japan

People with the surname
Azusa Nojiri (born 1982), Japanese marathon runner
Hōei Nojiri (1885–1977), Japanese essayist and astronomer
Hōsuke Nojiri (born 1961), Japanese science fiction writer
Shinta Nojiri (born 1971), Japanese video game designer
Shin'ichi Nojiri, Japanese physicist and cosmologist

See also
Nojiri-juku (disambiguation)

Japanese-language surnames